Godavari Sunrise Convention Center (Nepali: गोदावारी सनराइज सम्मेलन केन्द्र) is the largest convention center of Nepal. The assembly hall was constructed in 43 Ropanis (approx 21875 m2)of land at a cost of NPR 810 million. The assembly hall has the capacity of 3000 people. The center was inaugurated by KP Sharma Oli in 2021.

Architecture and facility
The main building of the center has been designed as symbol of rising sun  and occupies about 27% of total land. The main hall is 28 m high and has a capacity of 3000 people. There is garden with area of 16 Ropanis (8140 m2) and has a parking area of 13 Ropanis (6614 m2).

Construction
The building was scheduled to be built by November 12, 2020 but it was delayed due to COVID19.

It was constructed by KC-Samanantar JV.

See also
International Convention Centre, Nepal
List of convention and exhibition centers

References

Convention centers in Nepal
2021 establishments in Nepal